The Apsara robam is played by a woman, sewn into tight-fitting traditional dress, whose graceful, sinuous gestures are codified to narrate classical myths or religious stories.

History

Apsara represent an important motif in the stone bas-reliefs of the Angkorian temples in Cambodia (8th–13th centuries AD), however all female images are not considered to be apsara. In harmony with the Indian association of dance with apsaras, Khmer female figures that are dancing or are poised to dance are considered apsara; female figures, depicted individually or in groups, who are standing still and facing forward in the manner of temple guardians or custodians are called devatas.

In 1940s, Queen Sisowath Kossomak Nearirath Serey Vatthana, the wife of King Norodom Suramarit, was sent an invitation to visit the Sothearath primary school. While there she saw the school mistress prepare an inspirational angkor apsara dance  performed by young school children in the paper apsara costume including Crown, Sampot and Flower, all referencing Apsara represented at Angkor Wat. The Queen got the idea to re-create the dance from Robam Phuong Neary, which led her first granddaughter, Princess Norodom Buppha Devi, a daughter of Norodom Sihanouk, to become the first professional apsara dancer of the modern era. The Princess started practicing the dance at five years old and danced apsara for first time during King Norodom Sihanouk's tenure.

In 1967, the fine–boned young princess, clad in silk and glittering jewels, performed beneath the stars on the open pavilion within the palace walls, accompanied by the royal dance troupe and the pinpeat orchestra. Selected by her grandmother, Queen Sisowath Kossomak, to become a dancer when she was only a baby. She toured the world as the principal dancer of the apsara role.

Costume
The costumes of the apsara role is based on the devatas as depicted on bas-relief of Angkor Wat. They wear a sampot sarabap, a type of silk brocade that is intricately pleated in the front.

Headdress
The headdress of the lead apsara has three points or tips, with two rows of spherical decorations like the apsara pictured at Angkor Wat. Headdress worn by the subordinate dancers commonly have three points and only one row of sphere decoration. These crowns often include garlands of artificial hair with ornate adornments. The five-points crowns are frequently absent in modern dance routines.

Accessories
This round decorative collar (red colored) is highly visible; found just below the neck, the collar is embellished with detailed gold-colored copper ornaments and beaded designs.  The elaborate decorations is usually found gracefully decorated on two separate rows.  Additional copper ornaments are found hanging below these rows, in the shape of difficult-to-describe warped spear tips, the largest of which is centralized.

Dangling earrings, which are bound in bunches, traditionally stretch almost to the shoulder.  These dangling earrings are mainly duplicated from the design of the 'krorsang' flower (a large spiny tree with sour fruit) and are preferred to the 'mete' (chili) flowers, which are held to be less beautiful.

There are a total of four types of wrist jewelry: kong rak, patrum, kong ngor, and sanlek. The first is a truly beautiful diamond-like studded bracelet a fine and elegantly wrist jewel decorated in a tree branch-like fashion, the second is more of a spring-like coiled gold colored thick copper while the third type of bracelet (two sets are worn) are small round beaded orb/sphere bunches delicately connected to one another, the last bracelet is an intricate and well decorated thickly rounded jewel.  Additionally an Apsara dancer may be found wearing a garland of jasmine.

Two types of gold ankle jewelry are usually worn by the Apsara dancer, the first being kong tong chhuk the second kong ngor (or kong kravel).

The sangvar is a loosely decorated band of beads worn crosswise. The golden flower is considered a body-decorating element, either worn on the waist or carried during the performance. It too is gold in color, and made of thin flexible copper.

Prima Ballerinas

In the Royal Ballet, a prima ballerina for the apsara role is considered. Starting with Princess Norodom Buppha Devi there have been many others since the dance's conception. Sin Sakkada is the current prima ballerina for the apsara role.

Mrs. Seng Sreymom (អ្នកស្រី សេង ស្រីមុំ)
Mrs.  Voan Savai (អ្នកស្រី វ័ន សាវៃ )
Mrs. Douch Thach (អ្នកស្រី ឌុក ថាច )
Mrs. Voan Savong( អ្នកស្រី វ័ន សាវង្ស)
Mrs. Yim Devi (អ្នកស្រី យឹម ទេវី)
Mrs. Mom Kanika (អ្នកស្រី ម៉ម កណិការ )
Mrs. Ok Phalla (អ្នកស្រី អ៊ុក ផល្លា )
Mrs. Sok Sokhoeun (អ្នកស្រី សុខ សុខឿន)
Mrs. Chap Chamroeunmina (អ្នកស្រី ចាប ចំរើនមិនា)
Mrs. Chen Chansoda (អ្នកស្រី ចិន្ត ចន្ទសុដា)
Mrs. Sin Sakkada (កញ្ញា សុិន សក្កដា)

See also
 Dance in Cambodia
 Earth in Flower
 Khmer classical dance

References

External links

Robam Moni Mekhala (PL)
Taniec Apsar – rozrywka bogów i królów (PL)

Cambodian dances